Giuseppe Molinari (born 11 January 1938 in Scoppito, L'Aquila Province) is an Italian Catholic bishop, who served as Archbishop of L'Aquila.

Born in Scoppito, he was ordained to the priesthood on 29 June 1962.

On 30 September 1989 he was appointed Bishop of Rieti by Pope John Paul II. He received his episcopal consecration on the following December 8 from Archbishop Mario Peressin, assisted by Bishop Francesco Amadio and Archbishop Cleto Bellucci as co-consecrators.

Bishop Molinari was later named Coadjutor Archbishop of L'Aquila on 16 March 1996. He succeeded Archbishop Peressin as Archbishop of L'Aquila upon the latter's resignation on 6 June 1998.

Archbishop Molinari took an active role in dealing with the aftermath of the 2009 L'Aquila earthquake disaster and has also been involved in the reconstruction process.

On 8 June 2013 he retired as archbishop. Archbishop Giuseppe Petrocchi was appointed to be his successor.

References

External links and additional sources
 (for Chronology of Bishops)
 (for Chronology of Bishops)
Archdiocese of L'Aquila official profile

1938 births
20th-century Italian Roman Catholic archbishops
Living people
People from the Province of L'Aquila
21st-century Italian Roman Catholic archbishops
Bishops of Rieti
Bishops of L'Aquila